{{DISPLAYTITLE:Delta1 Chamaeleontis}}

Delta1 Chamaeleontis, Latinized from δ1 Chamaeleontis, is a close double star located in the constellation Chamaeleon. It has a combined apparent visual magnitude of 5.47, which is just bright enough for the star to be faintly seen on a dark rural night. With an annual parallax shift of 9.36 mas, it is located around 350 light years from the Sun. This pair is one of two stars named Delta Chamaeleontis, the other being the slightly brighter Delta2 Chamaeleontis located about 6 arcminutes away. Delta Chamaeleontis forms the southernmost component of the constellation's "dipper" or bowl. Together with Gamma Chamaeleontis, they point to a spot that is within 2° of the south celestial pole.

The two components of Delta1 Chamaeleontis have visual magnitudes of 6.3 and 6.5. As of 2000, the pair had an angular separation of 0.783 arcseconds along a position angle of 83.8°. They can be separated by a  aperture telescope. The stellar classification of Delta1 Chamaeleontis is K0 III, which matches an evolved K-type giant star.

References

Chamaeleontis, Delta1
Chamaeleon (constellation)
Chamaeleontis, Delta1
Durchmusterung objects
052595
04231
093779